Agdistis espunae is a moth in the family Pterophoridae. It is known from Spain.

The wingspan is 22–25 mm. The forewings and hindwings are grey.

References

Agdistinae
Moths described in 1978